Ian North (March 24, 1952 – February 28, 2021) was an American musician, producer, and painter known for being part of the bohemian punk movement in United States with his power pop band Milk 'N' Cookies.

Early life and career
Ian North was born in Brooklyn, New York, United States. He grew up in Long Island. He received his first guitar at age 12, but being virtually tone deaf, could not play any songs other than those he composed. In 1970, he slowly started to get serious about his artwork.

Milk 'N' Cookies
In 1973, North formed a power pop and glam outfit called Milk 'N' Cookies along with Justin Strauss on vocals, Jay Weiss (replaced by Sal Maida, later in Roxy Music and Sparks) on bass and Mike Ruiz on drums (later in Paul Collins' Beat). While the album's release was initially delayed and largely ignored upon release, it has subsequently become a cult classic. After its reissue in 2005, the band headlined the Radio Heartbeat festival in 2007 without North. As younger bands that now claim Milk 'n' Cookies as an influence have gained in popularity, like Nobunny and Cheap Time, the band has garnered even more attention. In 2016, Captured Tracks released a 3xLP Milk 'N' Cookies boxset which included a book of liners featuring notes by members of Sonic Youth, Ramones, and Blondie.

British punk and new wave scene: Radio and Neo
After the split of Milk 'N' Cookies, North moved to England and formed Radio with Sparks bassist Martin Gordon and the Simon brothers, Paul and Robert. That group transformed to Neo after Gordon's departure (he joined Radio Stars) and changed line-ups, with North being the only remaining member until 1979, when his visa ended and he returned to New York. The same year, twelve Neo tracks were released in Britain by Aura Records as a North solo album, titled Neo.

Return to US and solo career
Back in New York, North took to newly affordable synth technology and recording equipment, first on his debut full-length album as a solo artist, My Girlfriend's Dead, and then on his Rape of the Orchids EP. During this time he also produced material for The Fast; he also filled in as the band's bassist in the music videos for their songs "Kids Just Wanna Dance" and "Love Me Like a Locomotive". From 1983 to 1993, North worked sporadically on the album Torch Songs & Arson. While the label originally slated to release the album folded in the decade over which it was created, it has since been made available for free download. In 2009, North ended the longest period of musical inactivity in his life, releasing the 12-song album, E Z Listening For Suicides, under the moniker "Darkjet".

Death
North died in Sarasota Florida following complications from a heart attack on February 28, 2021. He is survived by his wife of 20 years, Mooshi Chapel and four children, including artist Sammy thrashLife.

See also
Milk 'N' Cookies
Neo

References

External links 
 Blog and website for North's current musical project, Darkjet
 

1952 births
2021 deaths
American male singers
American punk rock singers
American male guitarists
American expatriates in England
Musicians from New York City
20th-century American guitarists
20th-century American male musicians